Johan Versluis (born 16 August 1983) is a former Dutch professional footballer who played his whole career as a defender for FC Dordrecht in the Dutch Eerste Divisie.

External links
 Voetbal International

1983 births
Living people
Dutch footballers
FC Dordrecht players
Eerste Divisie players
Footballers from Dordrecht

Association football defenders